The following highways are numbered 383:

Brazil
  BR-383
  SP-383

Japan
  Japan National Route 383

Spain
  Autovía A-383

United States
  U.S. Route 383 (former)
  Arkansas Highway 383 (former)
  Georgia State Route 383
  K-383 (Kansas highway)
  Maryland Route 383
  New York State Route 383
  Ohio State Route 383
  Puerto Rico Highway 383
  South Carolina Highway 383 (former)
  Tennessee State Route 383 (unsigned designation for US-58)
  Virginia State Route 383